Harmen van Straaten (born 15 September 1958) is a Dutch author and illustrator.

He has illustrated books by numerous Dutch and Belgian authors, including Carli Biessels, Bette Westera, Hilde Vandermeeren and Jaap ter Haar.

In 2013, his book Je bent super... Jan! was the Kinderboekenweekgeschenk during the Boekenweek of that year.

His uncle Peter van Straaten was a Dutch cartoonist and comics artist.

References

External links 

 Harmen van Straaten (in Dutch), Digital Library for Dutch Literature

Living people
1958 births
Place of birth missing (living people)
Dutch children's book illustrators
Dutch illustrators
Dutch male writers